Gadwal is a City and the district headquarters of Jogulamba Gadwal district in the Indian state of Telangana. Gadwal historically served as the capital of Gadwal Samsthanam, a vassal of the Nizam of Hyderabad. Gadwal was previously a part of the Hyderabad State.

Geography 
Gadwal's infrastructure includes a railway junction, river, government-owned land, a sub-collector office, national highway connectivity and brand image in the country. It is situated on the southern banks of Khrisna River.

History 

Gadwal developed around a fort built by the Gadwal ruler Sri Somashekar Ananda bhoopal Reddy known as  Somanadri, Gadwal Samsthanam, which was a vassal of the Nizam of Hyderabad. It was protected by Mallichetti vamshiyulu. The Nagi Reddy, known today as Nagappa, was an Ayngarashakulu of Gadwal Samsthanam (Raja Somanadri was a minor). He died in a war with Sultans. Nagappa was succeeded by Narsappa as Gadwal Samsthanam Ayngarashakulu, but had to leave the palace.

Demographics 
 Gadwal had a population of 53,560.  Males constituted 51% of the population and females 49%. 13% of the population was under 6 years of age.
As of 2011 this had risen to 63,177

Landmarks
Gadwal Fort is an imposing structure around which the old town sprawls. The fort houses several old temples, the most important of which is Sri Chennakesava Swamy. Another well-known temple, Jammulamma, is located west to the city.

The Priyadarshini Jurala Project is a large dam under construction (as of 2017) near Gadwal. It has almost 62 gates, and its power generation capacity is 234 MW.

Economy

Gadwal Saree 
Gadwala is known for its handloom zari/jari chiralu (Gadwal sari). It was registered as one of the geographical indication from Telangana by Geographical Indications of Goods (Registration and Protection) Act, 1999. They are most notable for the Zari on the saris. The sari consists of a cotton body with a silk pallu which called Sico saris. The weave is so light that the saree can be packed in a matchbox. For Lord Venkateshwara Tirumala Tirupati Devasthanam (TTD) Bramhotsavam starts with Gadwala-weaved Pattu Vastralu every year.

Transportation

Rail 

Gadwal has a rail junction connecting to other towns and cities, with more than 40 trains passing through daily. The railway station is on Secunderabad–Dhone section. Gadwal became connected by rail to Raichur, Karnataka, after commissioning of the new line on 12 October. Gadwal railway station is planned to become a four-line connecting junction with the addition of a Gadwal–Macherla line. The Railway Department has sufficient land to be used for new railway projects.

Road 
A new national highway (Kothakota–Mantralayam) starts from Kothakota then reaches Gadwal, Ieeja, Gudur and Mantralayam. The newly sanctioned Yerravally–Raichur National highway also passes through Gadwal.

Telangana State Road Transport Corporation (TSRTC) runs bus services from Gadwal to major towns and villages.

Solar energy 

In popular culture 

 2009 Telugu film, Arundhati is set in Gadwal.

References 

Cities and towns in Jogulamba Gadwal district
Jogulamba Gadwal district
Mandals in Jogulamba Gadwal district